Ulceby Aerodrome Platform railway station was situated  northeast of Ulceby North Junction between Ulceby and the village of South Killingholme, Lincolnshire, England. It was opened by LNER to serve the Second World War airfield RAF North Killingholme, whose southern perimeter lay a short distance to the north.

A workman's ticket to the station, issued at Cleethorpes on 26 June 1943, indicates its latest possible opening date. Construction of the airfield started on 23 September 1942; it went on to close operationally on 31 October 1945, being used for some time thereafter for ordnance storage.

The use of the word "Platform" in an LNER station name usually indicated an unstaffed halt.

The line through the station was, and in 2015 remained, the main goods line to and from Immingham Dock. Up to the outbreak of the Second World War the only passenger traffic along the line was occasional ocean liner specials to Immingham Eastern Jetty. Unadvertised workmen's services using the line, plying between Cleethorpes and Immingham Dock via Habrough, are known to have run from at least 1954 to 1963, becoming an advertised service until cessation in 1969. It is not known whether this service started well before 1954 or a special service for Ulceby Aerodrome workers and military personnel was provided for the period the station was open.

By 2015 no trace of the station remained.

References

Sources

Further reading

External links
 The station site on a 1937-61 OS map National Library of Scotland
 The station and section of line railwaycodes
 RAF North Killingholme BCAR
 RAF North Killingholme forgottenairfields

Disused railway stations in the Borough of North Lincolnshire
Former London and North Eastern Railway stations
Railway stations in Great Britain opened in 1943
Railway stations in Great Britain closed in 1947